Haywood is a civil parish in Herefordshire, England, which is south-west of Hereford. The population of this civil parish at the 2011 census was 216.  The parish has no substantial settlements. However, it is home to one of the largest poultry farms in Great Britain, which is run by Cargill Meats Europe.

The Hay of Hereford was a Royal forest in the early Middle Ages. It was granted by Empress Matilda to Milo of Gloucester when she created him Earl of Hereford. The woodlands can be seen on Saxton's 1577 map of Herefordshire.

Haywood was officially outside of any parish in the mid 1800s.

References

External links

Villages in Herefordshire
English royal forests